The 2015–16 Penn Quakers women's basketball team represented the University of Pennsylvania during the 2015–16 NCAA Division I women's basketball season. The Quakers, led by seventh year head coach Mike McLaughlin, play their home games at the Palestra and were members of the Ivy League. Penn finished the season 24–5, 13–1 to win the Ivy League regular season title to earn an automatic trip to the NCAA women's tournament where they lost in the first round to Washington.

Previous season
The Quakers finished the 2014-15 season at 21–9, 11–3 to earn an automatic bid to the 2015 Women's National Invitation Tournament, which they lost to Temple in the second round.

Current season 
The Ivy League championship came down to the final game between Penn and Princeton for the second time in three seasons. Both entered the final game with the same 12–1 record, so the final regular-season game would mean the conference championship and automatic invitation to the NCAA tournament. Penn led much of the game, but Princeton took a one point lead with two minutes left in the game. Penn responded with a three-point shot to take a two point lead. Although Princeton had a chance to tie the game, they failed to do so, and Penn finished with the win, the conference championship, and an invitation to the 2016 NCAA tournament.

Roster

Schedule

|-
!colspan=8 style="background:#95001A; color:#01256E;"| Regular season

|-
!colspan=8 style="background:#95001A; color:#01256E;"| NCAA Women's Tournament

See also
 2015–16 Penn Quakers men's basketball team

References

Penn
Penn
Penn Quakers women's basketball seasons
Penn Quakers
Penn Quakers